Red Ranger is an unincorporated community in Bell County, in the U.S. state of Texas. According to the Handbook of Texas, the community had a population of 12 in 2000. It is located within the Killeen-Temple-Fort Hood metropolitan area.

History
The area in what is now known as Red Ranger today was first settled by Czech settlers at the turn of the 20th century, which included John Simek and Ben Lesikar. There were 20 residents and one business in the community in the 1940s. It went down to 15 in 1964 and had several scattered houses. Its population was 12 from 1990 through 2000.

Geography

Education
Red Ranger had its own school in the 1940s. Today, the community is served by the Rogers Independent School District.

References

Czech communities in the United States
Unincorporated communities in Texas
Unincorporated communities in Bell County, Texas